District 4 of the Oregon State Senate comprises southern Lane County and northern Douglas County. It is currently represented by Democrat Floyd Prozanski of Eugene.

Election results
District boundaries have changed over time, therefore, senators before 2013 may not represent the same constituency as today. From 1993 until 2003, the district covered eastern Washington County, and from 2003 until 2013 it covered a slightly different area in southern Oregon.

! Year
! Candidate
! Party
! Percent
! Opponent
! Party
! Percent
! Opponent
! Party
! Percent
|-
| 1984
| | Jim Simmons
| | Republican
| | 60.0%
| | John Tyner
| | Democratic
| | 40.0%
|-
| 1988
| | Paul Phillips
| | Republican
| | 100.0%
| colspan=3| Unopposed
|-
| 1992
| | Paul Phillips
| | Republican
| | 53.5%
| | Michael Brewin
| | Democratic
| | 46.5%
|-
| 1996
| | Eileen Quiring O'Brien
| | Republican
| | 53.2%
| | Patricia N. Biggs
| | Democratic
| | 46.8%
|-
| 2000
| | Ryan Deckert
| | Democratic
| | 52.0%
| | Eileen Qutub
| | Republican
| | 45.7%
| | Pavel Goberman
| | Libertarian
| | 2.2%
|-
| 2002
| | Tony Corcoran
| | Democratic
| | 58.6%
| | David Alsup
| | Republican
| | 41.4%
|-
| 2004
| | Floyd Prozanski
| | Democratic
| | 60.6%
| | Norm Thomas
| | Republican
| | 39.4%
|-
| 2006
| | Floyd Prozanski
| | Democratic
| | 63.7%
| | Bill Eddie
| | Republican
| | 36.3%
|-
| 2010
| | Floyd Prozanski
| | Democratic
| | 57.7%
| | Marilyn Kittelman
| | Republican
| | 42.1%
|-
| 2014
| | Floyd Prozanski
| | Democratic
| | 58.0%
| | Cheryl Mueller
| | Republican
| | 37.8%
| | William Bollinger
| | Libertarian
| | 3.8%
|-
| 2018
| | Floyd Prozanski
| | Democratic
| | 59.2%
| | Scott Rohter
| | Republican
| | 38.3%
| | Frank Lengele, Jr.
| | Libertarian
| | 2.3%

References

04
Douglas County, Oregon
Lane County, Oregon